Johnny Rico may refer to:

 Johnny Rico (Starship Troopers)
 Johnny Rico (author), freelance journalist